Laure Soulié (born 28 April 1987) is a retired Andorran biathlete who originally competed for France as her mother is French and Andorra had no team. She has competed for Andorra since 2009 and represented Andorra at the 2014 Winter Olympics. Her best placing is the 9th place in 15 km individual race in Ruhpolding, Germany in the 2013-2014 season.

References

External links 
 

1987 births
Living people
Andorran female biathletes
Olympic biathletes of Andorra
French people of Andorran descent
Andorran people of French descent
Biathletes at the 2014 Winter Olympics